Matt G. Siebert (March 11, 1883 – October 26, 1961) was a member of the Wisconsin State Assembly.

Biography
Siebert was born on March 11, 1883, in Stevens Point, Wisconsin. He was married to Carolina J. Lager. Siebert died on October 26, 1961, and is buried in Wilmot, Wisconsin.

Career
Siebert was a member of the Assembly twice. First, from 1935 to 1936 and second, from 1939 to 1946. He was also an unsuccessful candidate for the Assembly in 1948. Additionally, Siebert was Chairman of Salem, Kenosha County, Wisconsin, and a member of the Kenosha County, Wisconsin Board. Originally a Democrat, he later became a Republican.

References

People from Stevens Point, Wisconsin
People from Salem Lakes, Wisconsin
Mayors of places in Wisconsin
County supervisors in Wisconsin
1883 births
1961 deaths
20th-century American politicians
Democratic Party members of the Wisconsin State Assembly
Republican Party members of the Wisconsin State Assembly